Plakothira is a genus of flowering plants belonging to the family Loasaceae.

Its native range is Marquesas.

Species:

Plakothira frutescens 
Plakothira parviflora 
Plakothira perlmanii

References

Loasaceae
Cornales genera